Chigusa Kotoko (千種任子, July 19, 1855 - February 1, 1944) was the fourth concubine of Emperor Meiji. She gave birth to two daughters who died of meningitis in infancy. Although Meiji was the last Japanese emperor to have more than one consort, the official role at court was not abolished until 1924; surviving concubines remained as members of the imperial family in retirement.

See also
Empress Shōken, primary consort of Emperor Meiji, later Empress Dowager
Hamuro Mitsuko, first concubine
Hashimoto Natsuko, second concubine
Yanagihara Naruko, third concubine of Emperor Meiji, mother of Emperor Taishō
Sono Sachiko, fifth concubine

References 

Ben-Ami Shillony, Enigma of the Emperors: Sacred Subservience in Japanese History, 2021, page 152.

Imperial House of Japan
1855 births
1944 deaths
Japanese concubines
Emperor Meiji